USS Powhatan (ID–3013) was a transport ship for the United States Navy during World War I. She was originally the SS Hamburg, a  built in 1899 by Aktiengesellschaft Vulkan of Stettin, Germany, for the Hamburg America Line. At the outset of World War I the ship was interned by the United States.

She was soon chartered by the American Red Cross to take medical personnel and supplies to Europe. Renamed Red Cross, she left New York in mid-September, 1914.

When the U.S. entered World War I in April 1917, she was seized and converted to a troop transport.  Originally commissioned as USS Hamburg (ID-3013), the ship was renamed Powhatan on 5 September 1917. During World War I, she carried 15,274 troops to France and after the war she returned 11,803 servicemen to the United States.

After decommissioning by the U.S. Navy, the ship was turned over to the United States Shipping Board, and chartered for mercantile service until broken up in 1928.

History

SS Hamburg 
The SS Hamburg was originally intended to be named Bavaria, being renamed only a month prior to launching. On completion, SS Hamburg served the Hamburg-Far East (until 1904 when Hapag and NDL no longer combined on the mail route), Hamburg-New York and Genoa-New York runs for the Hamburg America Line.  The ship was also twice used by Kaiser Wilhelm II as his state yacht for foreign visits, during which time the ship was painted white overall.

SS Red Cross 

Due to British Royal Navy control of the seas she was caught in New York at the outbreak of World War I.

Chartered by the American Red Cross to take medical personnel and supplies to Europe and renamed Red Cross, she left New York in mid-September, 1914 and called at Falmouth, England; Paulliac, France; and Rotterdam, The Netherlands, before recrossing the Atlantic in October with American refugees on board. She remained at New York for the next two and a half years.

USS Hamburg and USS Powhatan 
The ship was commissioned as the troop transport USS Hamburg by the United States Navy on 16 August 1917, with Commander Gatewood Lincoln in command.  She was renamed Powhatan on 5 September 1917 and began the first of 12 consecutive Atlantic crossings on 12 November 1917. Powhatan was twice attacked by a submarine in the Bay of Biscay on 4 April 1918 but survived unscathed due to prompt location and depth charging by escorting destroyers. From 12 November 1917 to 9 December 1918, she carried 15,274 troops to France and after the war she returned 11,803 servicemen to the United States.

Powhatan was decommissioned on 2 September 1919 and was turned over to the Army Transport Service at New York, and finally to the United States Shipping Board.

Postwar 
In August, 1920, the ship was renamed New Rochelle and under charter to the Baltic Steamship Corp of America, sailed from New York to Danzig.  On 11 February 1921 she sailed under charter to the United States Mail Steamship Company on the same run, and in May she was again renamed Hudson

On charter to the United States Lines in August 1921, she sailed from New York to Bremen, before again being renamed President Fillmore in 1922.  After round the world service with the Dollar Line of San Francisco, she was sold for breaking up in 1928

References

External links 
 
  – Special Passenger List of Doctors, Nurses, and Officers for the SS Red Cross of the Hamburg America Line, Departing 13 September 1914 from New York to Falmouth, England, Commanded by Captain Armistead Rust, U.S.N. (Retired).

 

Barbarossa-class ocean liners
Ships of the Hamburg America Line
Transport ships of the United States Army
Transports of the United States Navy
World War I auxiliary ships of the United States
Passenger ships of the United States
1899 ships
Ships built in Stettin